The QG engine is a , ,  and  straight-4 piston engine from Nissan. It is a lean-burn aluminum DOHC 4-valve design with variable valve timing and optional NEO Di direct injection.

The QG engines were designed by Nissan's Aichi Kikai division  in Japan.

Nissan websites state the QG as standing for "Quality and Green".

QG13DE
The QG13DE is a  DOHC 16-valve with 4-cylinder.
Bore x Stroke= 

It is used in the following vehicles:
 1999- Nissan Wingroad/ADVAN Y11 Series
 1998- Nissan Sunny
 2005- Nissan Sentra N16 series for low-end models (Philippines)

QG15DE
Water-cooled straight 4 cylinder engine with  capacity and DOHC control.

This engine is used in:
 Nissan sunny
 Samsung SM3
 Nissan Tiida
Power outputs for N16 Almera:
 '00-'02: 90ps 
 '02-'06: 98ps

QG16DE
The QG16DE is a  straight 4-cylinder engine with Double Over Head Camshafts with 16 valves. The cylinder head also features Nissan Variable Cam Timing (N-VCT) and micro-polished camshafts. A new water pump assembly has been designed for the QG16DE; the design is based on the water pump from the GA16DE, the changes made it more efficient and reliable than its predecessor.

Specifications

 Displacement - 
 Layout - DOHC Inline-4 (Straight-4) with Nissan Variable Cam Timing
 Valves - 16, 4 for each cylinder
 Power -  at 6000 rpm
 Torque -  at 4000 rpm
 Redline - 6500 rpm
 Fuel Delivery System - Electronic fuel injection (EFI)
 Ignition system - 4 coils, 1 for each cylinder
 Fuel Compression Ratio - 9.5:1
It is used in the following vehicles:
 Nissan Sunny NEO with 5-speed manual or 4-speed automatic transmission
 Nissan Sunny N16 series sold in Sri Lanka
 Nissan Primera (P11.144) 2000-2002
 Nissan Primera (P12) edition sold in various countries across Europe
 Nissan Sentra N16 series in the Philippines and the N16 series Pulsar sold in Australia and New Zealand
 Renault Scala sold in Mexico and Colombia 
 Nissan Almera sold in South Africa

QG18DD

It is used in the following vehicles:
 1999-2004 Nissan Sunny

QG18DE
The  QG18DE was designed for Nissan by Aichi Machine Industry, Japan. It is manufactured both in Japan and the Mexican city of Aguascalientes. The engine is tuned to achieve most of its torque at low revs at the expense of raw power at high revs, making the engine very responsive in day-to-day driving. It has a cast-iron engine block, aluminum DOHC cylinder head, uses Multi-port fuel injection, forged-steel connecting rods, two single-piece cast camshafts and a cast-aluminum intake manifold. It also features N-VCT (Nissan's Valve Timing Control technology). This engine received the RJC Technology of The Year Award of 2001.

Specifications
 Displacement - 
 Layout - DOHC Inline-4 (Straight-4) with VVT tech (called NVTC).
 Valves - 16, 4 for each cylinder
 Redline - 6500 rpm
 Fuel Delivery System - electronic fuel injection
 Fuel compression ratio - 9.5:1
Emissions Control Devices
 OBDII - On-board Diagnostic System (codes can be read/erased by a variety of readers, e.g. ). Nissan Pulsar N16 Models without EuroOBD in Australia do not have OBDII.
 EGR - Exhaust Gas Recirculation
 HO2S - (4) Oxygen Sensors (2 before exhaust catalyst, 2 after) - note a series 2 1.8l has only 2 O2 sensors: 1 pre-catalytic-converter and 1 downstream from it.
 TWC - Three Way Catalyst (2 in exhaust manifold, 1 under car).
 EVAP - Charcoal Evaporative Purge Canister.
 Ignition Timing: 9 degrees BTDC (can be altered +/- 2 degrees using CONSULT-II handheld diagnostic tester, e.g. ).
 Knock Sensor - located on engine block; retards timing if pinging/detonation is detected.
 Heated Throttle Body - heated by engine coolant.

The QG18DE is used in the following vehicles:
 2000-2006 Nissan Sentra B15 and N16
 2000-2005 Nissan Pulsar N16
 1999-2002 Nissan Primera P11.144
 2002-2007 Nissan Primera P12
 2000-2006 Nissan Almera N16
 2000-2006 Nissan Almera Tino
 1999-2006 Nissan Primera
 2000-2006 Nissan Expert
 1998-2006 Nissan Avenir
 1999-2005 Nissan Wingroad/AD van Y11
 1999-2005 Nissan Bluebird Sylphy G10 
 1998-2004 Nissan Sunny B15

QG18DEN
The QG18DEN is the natural gas version of the QG18DE. It was used in the Nissan AD van from 2000 to 2008.

See also
 List of Nissan engines

References

QG
Straight-four engines
Gasoline engines by model